San Nazario is a town and comune in the province of Vicenza, Veneto, north-eastern Italy.

Sources
(Google Maps)

Cities and towns in Veneto